Sirin is a Russian mythological bird. Sirin may also refer to:

 Sirin, Iran, a village in Kermanshah Province, Iran
 Sirin, Baysan, a Palestinian village depopulated in 1948
 Sirin (Islamic history), one of Muhammad's slaves
 Şirin, a Turkish name
 Ephrem the Syrian, an ancient Syrian saint known as Sirin in Russia
 V. Sirin, the pen name of Vladimir Nabokov during his exile in Berlin
 Vaniel Sirin (born 1989), Haitian football player